The 1996–97 season was the 54th season in the existence of Nantes Atlantique and the club's 35th consecutive season in the top flight of French football.

Season summary
During the 1996–97 French football season, Nantes Atlantique competed in the French Division 1, Coupe de France, Coupe de la Ligue and UEFA Intertoto Cup.

Nantes Atlantique finished third in Division 1, thus qualifying for the 1997–98 UEFA Cup. At the end of the season, manager Jean-Claude Suaudeau, tired of his best players being sold in order to clear the club's debts, retired from football at the end of the season; he was replaced by the club's youth academy manager, Raynald Denoueix.

First-team squad

Reserve squad

Competitions

French Division 1

League table

Results summary

Results by round

Coupe de France

Coupe de la Ligue

UEFA Intertoto Cup

Group stage

Semi-final

Notes

References

FC Nantes seasons
Nantes